Desolate Branch is a stream in McDowell County, West Virginia, in the United States.

Desolate Branch has been noted for its unusual place name.

See also
List of rivers of West Virginia

References

Rivers of McDowell County, West Virginia
Rivers of West Virginia